is an inhabited island in the Seto Inland Sea of Japan, about 4.5 km northwest of the port of Takuma in the city of Mitoyo, Kagawa Prefecture. The total area is 3.72 km² with a population of 216 (as of 2015). The island was the site of a maritime school that operated from 1897 to 1987, now preserved as a museum. The former post office is the site of the Missing Post Office.

See also 
 Vargula hilgendorfii

References 

Islands of Japan
Geography of Kagawa Prefecture
Mitoyo, Kagawa